The Invisible Plane (commonly known as the Invisible Jet) is a plane appearing in DC Comics, commonly used by Wonder Woman as a mode of transport. It was created by William Moulton Marston and first appeared in Sensation Comics #1 (January 1942).

Original history
The Pre-Crisis version of the invisible plane was a necessity because before the Crisis on Infinite Earths rewrote Wonder Woman's history—along with the histories of many other heroes—Wonder Woman simply could not fly. She grew increasingly powerful through the Silver Age of comic books and beyond, acquiring the power to ride wind currents thus allowing her to imitate flight over short distance. This had limitations, however; for example, if there was no wind and the air was completely still she would be trapped on the ground or if dropped from a distance that she would helplessly fall out of control to the ground. Though this meant that she would rely on the invisible plane less frequently, she always had need of it.

The Invisible Plane was a creation of Diana's during her younger years on Paradise Island. She created it to be an improvement on her mother's planes which would be shot down in Man's World. The result of her innovation was an invisible plane that could fly at terrific speeds silently and not be detected by hostile forces, thus avoiding unpleasant conflict.  Initially, it was portrayed as being transparent.

The Invisible Plane appeared in the very first comic stories, including All-Star Comics #8, where it is shown as being able to fly at over 2000 miles per hour (MPH) and to send out rainbow rays that penetrate the mist around Paradise Island, as well as landing stealthily and having a built-in radio. Wonder Woman is seen storing the plane at an abandoned farm near Washington, D.C., in the barn; she goes there as Lt. Prince and changes clothes in some of the earliest tales. Though never explicitly stated, the Plane is presumably stored there when not in use for the rest of the Pre-Crisis era. In a story made shortly after, it flies at 40 miles a second.

Shortly thereafter, the telepathic capacities of Wonder Woman's tiara allow her to summon it, often to hover or swoop by the War Department, and she would exit on a rope ladder. She uses the plane to fly into outer space, and frequently transports Etta Candy and the Holliday Girls, Steve Trevor, or others. During the 1950s, the plane became a jet, and was often shown swooping over Lt. Prince's office; she stripped out of her uniform at super speed and would bound to the plane. Though the Plane was depicted as semi-transparent for the reader's convenience, in-story dialogue indicated that it actually was completely invisible, or at least able to become so as the need arose.

Wonder Woman continued to use the plane for super-speed, outer space, and multi-dimensional transport up until the un-powered era of Diana Prince. When Wonder Woman resumed super-powered, costumed operations in 1973, she continued to use the jet as before, but did glide on air currents for short distances. At one point, Aphrodite granted the plane the power to fly faster than the speed of light for any interstellar voyages her champion might undertake. Thanks to tinkering by gremlins, the Plane even developed intelligence and the power to talk. The Plane proved a good friend, eager to help his "mistress" and her loved ones in any way possible. It got along especially well with Steve Trevor.

Later history
In the Post-Crisis version of the DC Universe, Wonder Woman can fly, regardless of wind currents, and so has little need for the Invisible Plane. The Plane's history has subsequently been revised as well.

The origin of the Modern Age version of the Invisible Jet was chronicled during John Byrne's run of Wonder Woman with more detailed information chronicled in Wonder Woman Secret Files #1.

The being that would one day be called the Invisible Plane began life as an alien "morphing crystal" circling a distant planet with its "family", other morphing crystals who are collectively called the Ring. In their natural state, the Plane and its fellow members of the Ring resemble eggs made of semi transparent plastic. In time, it was separated from its family and was found by the Lansinarians, a blind subterranean race that lived underneath Antarctica. The Lansinarians could not react quickly enough to changes in their environment. Thus, they developed the morphing crystal they had found into a life support device that catered to their needs. These beings later bestow the device on Wonder Woman in gratitude for saving them. The plane, which possesses a sophisticated artificial intelligence, responds to Wonder Woman's thoughts. It is able to render itself invisible as well as alter its shape, transforming into any form of vehicle its bearer desires, be it a jet, submarine, motorcycle, or horse-drawn chariot.

Wonder Woman, however, was initially unaware that her Invisible Plane was not only alive but was quite aware that it was being treated by its mistress as a lifeless tool.

Lacking her daughter's power to fly and taking her daughter's original Golden Age incarnation, Wonder Woman's mother, Hippolyta, makes good use of the Plane during her time-travelling stint as the Wonder Woman of the 1940s. To adjust to the era, she willed the device to assume the form of a prop-driven plane and it took on the appearance of the original invisible plane of the earlier comics. After its return to modern times, the Plane once again begins to display a personality, and like its earlier incarnation, it ultimately develops the power to talk. When a villain manipulates the Plane's feelings of anger at having been ignored for so many years regardless of faithful service, it attacks Wonder Woman and her friends. But after realizing what it had done, it displays its capacity for remorse after and tried to make amends by transforming itself into a floating base above Gateway City for its mistress. Proving a good—though mostly silent and faceless—friend, the Plane receives a proper name: WonderDome. Later, Dome's technology is also incorporated into the Amazons' city of Themyscira following its reconstruction in the wake of the Imperiex War. Dome even reunites with members of its long lost family at one point.

In Wonder Woman (vol. 2) #201 (by Greg Rucka), Dome sacrifices itself to prevent a tidal wave from killing thousands of innocent people. Having "died" to save so many, Dome is now more like a robot than a person. While it can still function in its traditional shape of an invisible plane, it can no longer alter its shape and is now a lifeless inanimate object that is neither intelligent nor self-aware.

Specifications
 Originally, the plane was supposed to be silent and move at supersonic speeds.
 It was created to attune itself to its user and its environment. The vessel responds appropriately and can take the form of any vehicle of earth, water and beyond (a submarine or rocket ship). As seen in its stint as WonderDome, it could even turn itself into a flying fortress.
 It has the power to be undetectable by radar or the human eye and the ability to shift from its crystal, "transparent mode" to complete invisibility rendering both itself and its occupants truly invisible, in true cloaking device technology form.
 The invisible jet propels itself by harnessing gravitation particles. It is in this fashion also that it shields its passengers from the forces of sudden acceleration.
 In outer space, the craft can extrude a portion of itself around Wonder Woman. Without taking in additional air supply, it can process one's own exhaled oxygen to allow breathing for 20 minutes. It can sense Wonder Woman's thoughts and will respond to her needs.
 Arsenal: The invisible jet can shape projectile weapons out of its own substance but doing so depletes the amount of material in the vessel. When such depletion occurs, the craft can regenerate itself slowly. This function is to be avoided and used only when absolutely necessary as a last resort.
 Although Wonder Woman possesses the power of flight, the invisible jet is very useful, as it contains certain on-board equipment, serves as a protective shelter, carries Wonder Woman's cargo, and, of course, renders her invisible for stealth missions.

In other media

Television

Live-action
 A full-size plane was featured in Wonder Woman, and shown several times during the World War II era. It was featured as a jet in two episodes of the CBS series, set in the 1970s, before disappearing. After its disappearance, Wonder Woman runs at incredible speeds, jumping great distances, or even changes costumes and rides to her destination on motorcycles.

 In the Supergirl episode "Welcome to Earth", a veiled reference is made to the plane when the President of the United States (played by Lynda Carter, who portrayed Wonder Woman in the live-action series) tells Supergirl "you ought to see my other jet".

Animation
 The invisible plane is a regular feature on the Super Friends cartoon show; Wonder Woman gives a ride to Aquaman and the Wonder Twins on a regular basis. In Challenge of the Super Friends, the invisible jet is shown using golden lasso projectiles.
 The invisible plane has appeared on the animated series Justice League Unlimited. It had a separate origin that was supposed to have been told in an animated TV movie, Justice League: Worlds Collide, but the feature was never produced. Had it been produced, it would have also explained how the League roster would be expanded and transformed into Justice League Unlimited. At the 2007 Wonder Con in San Francisco, California, Bruce Timm announced that Justice League: Worlds Collide might be produced in the next few years. This was not the case, and the film was never made, but the origin story of the invisible plane intended for Worlds Collide was later worked into the stand-alone film Justice League: Crisis on Two Earths, as noted below.
 Wonder Woman and her invisible plane appear in the Batman: The Brave and the Bold episode "Scorn of the Star Sapphire!"
 The plane appears on Teen Titans Go! in a two-part special where the Teen Titans imitate the Justice League.
 In the 2016 animated series Justice League Action, the jet is referenced by Booster Gold in "Watchtower Tours".
 The plane appears in the Harley Quinn episode "Bachelorette". It is used as a passenger plane that takes visitors to and back from Themyscira, which had been converted into a resort. In the show's third season premiere, "HarlIvy", Harley and Ivy have stolen the jet and use it to engage in a worldwide bender of crime and shenanigans. The second episode of the season reveals the jet was destroyed during a fight with Plastique.
 The plane appears in the Scooby-Doo and Guess Who? episode "The Scooby of a Thousand Faces!".

Film
 In the 2009 animated film Wonder Woman, Diana receives an invisible plane to transport Steve Trevor back to the outside world after he crash lands on their island and its hull configuration is consciously modelled after Trevor's fighter plane. In this version it is a stealth fighter jet and even its missiles are invisible. No explanation is ever given as to the origin of the invisible plane.
 In the 2010 animated film Justice League: Crisis on Two Earths, Wonder Woman commandeers an attack plane from Owlman (an evil version of Batman) while the Justice League is on a parallel Earth dominated by their villainous counterparts, the Crime Syndicate. During the battle, the plane's cloaking device (the "Chameleon Circuit") shorts out while still in use, placing the vehicle in "cloak" mode permanently. After the mission's successful completion, Wonder Woman keeps the invisible plane as "spoils of war".
 In the 2011 film Green Lantern, Hal Jordan gives his nephew Jason a crystal transparent toy model plane that alludes to the Invisible Plane.
 The invisible plane appears in the 2013 film Lego Batman: The Movie – DC Super Heroes Unite.
 In The Lego Movie during an attack in which the Batmobile is destroyed, Wonder Woman says "To the Invisible Jet!"; it is also destroyed afterwards. This phrase is a spoof of Batman's catchphrase from the 1960s live action television series of Batman.
 In the 2019 animated movie Wonder Woman: Bloodlines, the jet is a new stealth jet for the US Air Force, featuring an active camouflage surface, secretly appropriated by Etta Candy for Wonder Woman and Steve Trevor's use.
 In Wonder Woman 1984, Diana Prince and Steve Trevor take a fighter-bomber (in the film depicted by a fictional aircraft based on parts of the cockpit of an F-111 Aardvark and the fuselage, wings and tail of the Panavia Tornado GR1 - Reg ZA355) to fly to Egypt. When detected by a radar, Diana makes the plane invisible using her demigoddess abilities, as her father the Greek god Zeus hid Themyscira.
 In DC League of Super-Pets, Krypto, Ace and the rest of the super pets attempted to use Wonder Woman's invisible jet to get to Stryker's Island to stop Lulu from breaking Lex Luthor out, only to get shot down by Whiskers. The running gag in the film was the jet was described to actually be more transparent than invisible.

Video games
 The invisible plane appears in Lego Dimensions and Lego DC Super-Villains.

Spoofs
 On April 1, 2015, the Smithsonian had a limited one-day viewing of the plane.
 In a few episodes of SpongeBob SquarePants, Mermaid Man and Barnacle Boy's Invisible Boatmobile directly spoofs both the invisible plane and Batman's Batmobile. 
 The plane made a brief appearance on Family Guy.
 The plane is assumed to appear in the Total Drama series, in which Lindsay impersonates Wonder Woman, and remarks when Courtney steps on her Invisible Jet.

Web series
 The invisible plane has appeared on the web series DC Super Hero Girls episode "Dude, Where's My Invisible Jet?".

Notes

References
 Jett, Brett. "Who Is Wonder Woman?" (Manuscript) (2009): "Allegories", pp 72-73.
 Jett, Brett. "Who Is Wonder Woman?--Bonus PDF"", (2009): "Bonus #2: Top 10 WW Questions Answered", pp 9–10.
 Marston, W. M. (1936), "Cost Of Careers", in The Delineator, pp. 7, volume 128.
 Marston, William Moulton. Emotions Of Abnormal People.  London: Kegan Paul, Trench, Trübner & Co, Ltd. 1928.  
 Jimenez, Phil (2008), "Wonder Woman's Invisible Jet", in Dougall, Alastair, The DC Comics Encyclopedia, London: Dorling Kindersley, pp. 34–35, 

Wonder Woman
Fiction about invisibility
Fictional elements introduced in 1942